Kim Kong-chyong (金功青, born September 2, 1986, in Hyogo) is a former South Korean football player for Fukushima United FC.

Club statistics
Updated to 2 February 2018.

References

External links

Profile at Fukushima United FC

1986 births
Living people
Ryutsu Keizai University alumni
Association football people from Hyōgo Prefecture
South Korean footballers
J3 League players
Japan Football League players
Fukushima United FC players
Association football midfielders